Vladimir Firm (5 June 1923 – 27 November 1996) was a Croatian football player. He was part of Yugoslavia's squad at the 1952 Summer Olympics, but he did not play in any matches.

International career
Firm made his debut for Yugoslavia in a June 1947 friendly match away against Romania and earned a total of 3 caps scoring no goals. His final international was a December 1949 World Cup qualification match away against France.

References

External links
 
 Profile at Serbian Federation website.
 Career story at Nogometni Leksikon. 

1923 births
1996 deaths
Footballers from Zagreb
Association football forwards
Yugoslav footballers
Yugoslavia international footballers
1950 FIFA World Cup players
Olympic footballers of Yugoslavia
Olympic silver medalists for Yugoslavia
Footballers at the 1952 Summer Olympics
Medalists at the 1952 Summer Olympics
Olympic medalists in football
NK Lokomotiva Zagreb players
FK Partizan players
NK Zagreb players
FSV Frankfurt players
FC Solothurn players
Yugoslav First League players
Oberliga (football) players
Swiss 1. Liga (football) players
Yugoslav expatriate footballers
Expatriate footballers in West Germany
Yugoslav expatriate sportspeople in West Germany
Expatriate footballers in Switzerland
Yugoslav expatriate sportspeople in Switzerland